Myra Yvonne Chouteau (March 7, 1929 – January 24, 2016) was an American ballerina and one of the "Five Moons" or Native prima ballerinas of Oklahoma. She was the only child of Corbett Edward and Lucy Annette Chouteau. She was born March 7, 1929, in Fort Worth, Texas. In 1943, she became the youngest dancer ever accepted to the Ballet Russe de Monte Carlo, where she worked for fourteen years. In 1962, she and her husband, Miguel Terekhov, founded the first fully accredited university dance program in the United States, the School of Dance at the University of Oklahoma. A member of the Shawnee Tribe, she also had French ancestry, the great-great-great-granddaughter of Maj. Jean Pierre Chouteau.  From the Chouteau family of St. Louis, he established Oklahoma's oldest European-American settlement, at the present site of Salina, in 1796. She grew up in Vinita, Oklahoma.

Career
Chouteau was born in Fort Worth, Texas, on March 7, 1929. Her father, Corbett Chouteau, worked for an oil company, while her mother, Lucy Annette (née Taylor), was a schoolteacher. Inspired to dance at age four after seeing the great ballerina Alexandra Danilova dance in Oklahoma City, Chouteau studied at the School of American Ballet in New York before Danilova recommended her in 1943 to Serge Denham for the Ballet Russe de Monte Carlo. At 14, she was the youngest dancer ever accepted. Her first solo role was as Prayer in Coppelia. (1945). At age 18, she was the youngest member inducted into the Oklahoma Hall of Fame.

In 1956, Chouteau married dancer Miguel Terekhov. Her first husband was flutist and conductor Claude Monteux, though their brief marriage was annulled. After she had her first child with Terekhov, they moved to Oklahoma City.  Together they organized the Oklahoma City Civic Ballet (now Oklahoma City Ballet).  In 1962, they established the first fully accredited dance department in the United States at the University of Oklahoma at Norman, Oklahoma. She was featured in Ballets Russes, a documentary film by Dayna Goldfine and Dan Geller that premiered at the Sundance Film Festival in 2005. She died after a long illness on January 24, 2016. During her career, she worked with  such noted choreographers as George Balanchine, Leonide Massine, Antony Tudor, Agnes de Mille, and Bronislava Nijinska.

Legacy and honors
Governor Frank Keating designated her an Oklahoma Treasure on October 8, 1997. She is portrayed in the mural Flight of Spirit, by Chickasaw artist Mike Larsen in the Oklahoma Capitol Rotunda, and in The Five Moons, a set of bronze sculptures by artist Gary Henson on the west lawn of the Tulsa Historical Society.

When the Smithsonian Institution's National Museum of the American Indian opened in Washington, D.C., in 2004, Chouteau was honored with the inaugural National Cultural Treasures Award, celebrating her contribution to the nation's cultural heritage.

Further reading
 [Videorecording]

References

External links
Obituary: Smith Kernke Funeral Home
Video by OkNews: Five Native American Ballerinas
Photo: Yvonne Chouteau, Ballet Russe de Monte Carlo, c. 1948-1949, National Library of Australia
Photo: The Indian Ballerinas
"Chouteau, Yvonne", Encyclopedia of Oklahoma History and Culture
Obituary

1929 births
2016 deaths
People from Fort Worth, Texas
People from Vinita, Oklahoma
Artists from Oklahoma City
Ballet Russe de Monte Carlo dancers
Prima ballerinas
American ballerinas
American people of French descent
Shawnee Tribe people
Native American dancers
Five Moons
20th-century Native Americans
21st-century Native Americans
20th-century Native American women
21st-century Native American women
20th-century American ballet dancers